The Cochrane & Area Humane Society is an animal shelter which holds the contract for animal services for the town of Cochrane, Alberta, and surrounding communities. It is a managed admission animal shelter which discourages surrendering a pet to the shelter.

It was founded and incorporated in 1998 and received charitable status in 1999.

In 2020, adoptions were continuing, with adjustments, during the COVID-19 pandemic.

References

External links
 

Animal charities based in Canada
No kill shelters